Exorcism: The Possession of Gail Bowers is a 2006 direct-to-DVD horror film by The Asylum, written and directed by Leigh Scott. It is considered to be a mockbuster of the 2005 film The Exorcism of Emily Rose.

Plot
The film takes place in an undisclosed part of Florida, in which a priest, Father Thomas Bates, is called upon to help exorcise Gail Bowers, who has come to be possessed by malevolent forces. Father Bates is first alerted to the matter by a local couple, Clark and Anne Pederson. Clark, a worker for Blackthorn Industries, tells of the problems that the neighborhood faces as the result of Gail's possessions, and that medical science has failed to make amends.

Using what powers are available, Father Bates visits Gail in her home and begins to perform an exorcism. It is during this service that the malevolent forces possessing Gail begin to fight back against the priest, and force themselves to be revealed for the first time.

Reception 
HorrorTalk commented that the film had a strong start and finish, but suffered in the middle. They also felt that its lead actress, Erica Roby, was "just not experienced enough to pull off such a demanding role".

See also
Dead Men Walking - Another horror film by The Asylum film studio, which was referenced in this film
Repossessed - A 1990 horror-comedy with a similar storyline
Exorcismus - A 2010 horror film with a similar storyline

References

External links
 Exorcism: The Possession of Gail Bowers at The Asylum
 

2006 horror films
2006 films
2006 psychological thriller films
American supernatural horror films
Religious horror films
Films about exorcism
Films directed by Leigh Scott
Films set in Florida
The Asylum films
2000s English-language films
2000s American films